William Wolseley may refer to:

William Wolseley (brigadier-general) (1640–1697) English army officer
William Wolseley (Royal Navy officer) (1756–1842) Royal Navy officer

See also
Wolseley baronets